Kahu or KAHU may refer to:

 KAHU (FM), a radio station (91.3 FM) licensed to serve Pahala, Hawaii, United States
 KIPA (AM), a radio station (1060 AM) licensed to serve Hilo, Hawaii, which held the call sign KAHU from 1984 to 2003
 , a Moa class inshore patrol vessel of the Royal New Zealand Navy
 , a Fairmile B motor launch of the Royal New Zealand Navy
 Project Kahu, a major upgrade for the A-4 Skyhawk fighter jet
 Swamp harrier, a large, slim bird of prey in the family Accipitridae (also known by the Māori-language name )

Places 
 Kahu, Chenaran, Razavi Khorasan Province, Iran
 Kahu, Dargaz, Razavi Khorasan Province, Iran